Viorica is a Romanian female given name, derived from Romanian vioară, a violet (flower). Notable people with the name include:

Viorica Agarici, a Romanian nurse, the chairwoman of the local Red Cross in the city of Roman during World War II and the Ion Antonescu regime
Viorica Cortez, a Romanian-born French mezzo-soprano
Viorica Cucereanu, a journalist from the Republic of Moldova
Viorica Dăncilă, a Romanian politician, member of the Social Democratic Party
Viorica Dumitru, a former Romanian sprint canoer
Viorica Ioja, a former Romanian rowing coxswain
Viorica Ionică, a former Romanian handball player
Viorica Iordache, a Romanian sprint canoer
Viorica Lepădatu, a retired Romanian rower
Viorica Moisuc, a Romanian politician and Member of the European Parliament
Viorica Marian, is a scientist with expertise in bilingualism and multilingualism
Viorica Neculai, a retired Romanian rower
Viorica Susanu, a Romanian Olympic rower
Viorica Țigău, a Romanian heptathlete
Viorica Țurcanu, a Romanian fencer
Viorica Ursuleac, a Romanian operatic soprano
Viorica Viscopoleanu, a retired Romanian Olympics long jumper

See also
Viorel, a male given name
Viola (given name), a female given name
Violet (given name), a female given name
Violeta (given name), a female given name
Violetta (given name), a female given name
Violette (given name), a female given name

Romanian feminine given names